The term Greek legislative election, 2015 may refer to:

Greek legislative election, January 2015 
Greek legislative election, September 2015